Olowo Imade succeeded his father, Ojugbelu at Okiti Upafa (Upafa Hills). He led his people to Oke-Made (Made-Hills) where they had a short-lived stay mainly due to wars and incessant thunderstorms which caused several fatalities of the Omo-lowos. They eventually moved to Okiti-Asegbo (present day center of Owo town) and expanded to the southern part of town where Olowo Imade along with the Ighare warriors/chiefs conquered the land and settled. The area was designated the Iloro (Uloro) quarters. Today, the 12 Iloro (Ighare) Chiefs are responsible for the installation and burial of the Olowo.

Olowo Imade is credited for naming the Owo Kingdom and establishing the Olowo Title. The meaning of Olowo means "He who Deserves Respect"

References 

https://dailytrust.com/a-visit-to-owo
In The Wilderness of Life: The Travails And Triumphs Of His Royal Highness Oba David Folagbade Olateru-Olagbegi III The Olowo Of Owo Kingdom : An Autobiography. University Press Plc., 2013. P. 35  
A Synopsis of Owo History, High Chief Aralepo Adedokun Joseph, First Edition, Iadmo Press. 2013 p. 18 
https://www.google.com/books/edition/Nigeria_Magazine/UBYOAQAAMAAJ?hl=en&gbpv=1&bsq=%22Olowo+Imade%22+-wikipedia&dq=%22Olowo+Imade%22+-wikipedia&printsec=frontcover
https://www.google.com/books/edition/Sir_Olateru_Olagbegi_II_KBE/zOQyAQAAIAAJ?hl=en&gbpv=1&bsq=%22Olowo+Imade%22+-wikipedia&dq=%22Olowo+Imade%22+-wikipedia&printsec=frontcover
https://www.google.com/books/edition/Spotlighting_Major_Towns_%E1%BB%8Cw%E1%BB%8D/ZYUuAQAAIAAJ?hl=en&gbpv=1&bsq=%22Olowo+Imade%22+-wikipedia&dq=%22Olowo+Imade%22+-wikipedia&printsec=frontcover

Year of birth missing (living people)
Living people